Seymour Martin Lipset (March 18, 1922 – December 31, 2006) was an American sociologist and political scientist (President of the American Political Science Association). His major work was in the fields of political sociology, trade union organization, social stratification, public opinion, and the sociology of intellectual life. He also wrote extensively about the conditions for democracy in comparative perspective. A socialist in his early life, Lipset later moved to the right, and was considered to be one of the first neoconservatives.

At his death in 2006, The Guardian called him "the leading theorist of democracy and American exceptionalism"; The New York Times said he was "a pre-eminent sociologist, political scientist and incisive theorist of American uniqueness"; and The Washington Post said he was "one of the most influential social scientists of the past half century."

Early life and education
Lipset was born in Harlem, New York City, the son of Russian Jewish immigrants. His family urged him to become a dentist.

He grew up in the Bronx among Irish, Italian and Jewish youth. "I was in that atmosphere where there was a lot of political talk," Lipset recalled, "but you never heard of Democrats or Republicans; the question was communists, socialists, Trotskyists, or anarchists. It was all sorts of different left wing groups." From an early age, Seymour was active in the Young People's Socialist League, "an organization of young Trotskyists that he would later head."   He graduated from City College of New York, where he was an anti-Stalinist leftist.  He received a PhD in sociology from Columbia University in 1949. Before that he taught at the University of Toronto.

Academic career
Lipset was the Caroline S.G. Munro Professor of Political Science and Sociology at Stanford University and a senior fellow at the Hoover Institution and then became the George D. Markham Professor of Government and Sociology at Harvard University. He also taught at Columbia University, the University of California, Berkeley, the University of Toronto, and George Mason University where he was the Hazel Professor of Public Policy.

Lipset was a member of the American Academy of Arts and Sciences, the United States National Academy of Sciences, and the American Philosophical Society. He was the only person to have been President of both the American Political Science Association (1979–1980) and the American Sociological Association (1992–1993). He also served as the President of the International Society of Political Psychology, the Sociological Research Association, the World Association for Public Opinion Research, the Society for Comparative Research, and the Paul F. Lazarsfeld Society in Vienna.

Lipset received the MacIver Prize for Political Man (1960) and, in 1970, the Gunnar Myrdal Prize for The Politics of Unreason.

In 2001, Lipset was named among the top 100 American intellectuals, as measured by academic citations, in Richard Posner's book, Public Intellectuals: A Study of Decline.

Academic research

"Some Social Requisites of Democracy: Economic Development and Political Legitimacy"

One of Lipset's most cited works is "Some Social Requisites of Democracy: Economic Development and Political Legitimacy" (1959), a key work on modernization theory on democratization, and an article that includes the Lipset hypothesis that economic development leads to democracy.

Lipset was one of the first proponents of the "theory of modernization", which states that democracy is the direct result of economic growth, and that “[t]he more well-to-do a nation, the greater the chances that it will sustain democracy.” Lipset's modernization theory has continued to be a significant factor in academic discussions and research relating to democratic transitions. It has been referred to as the "Lipset hypothesis" and the "Lipset thesis".

The Lipset hypothesis has been challenged by Guillermo O'Donnell, Adam Przeworski and Daron Acemoglu and James A. Robinson. 

One of the debates as to how exactly how democracy emerges, is between endogenous or exogenous democratization. Endogenous democratization holds the argument, that democratization happens as a result of the countries previous history leading up to that point. So here economic development and expansion of the middle class play a crucial role. A proponent of this viewpoint is Charles Boix and Susan C. Stokes. 
Exogenous democratization on the other hand argues, that democratization happens as a result of external factors, such as the zeitgeist of pro-democracy political movements seen across the world from the third wave of democratization up until the 1990s. According to Adam Przeworski and Fernando Limongi, the reason for the correlation between economic wealth and democracy is for the simple reason, that once a country have transitioned to a democratic rule, it have a much better chance of stay democratic if it is wealthy where as poor countries most often fall back into autocratic rule.

Political Man: The Social Bases of Politics

Political Man (1960) is an influential analysis of the bases of democracy, fascism, communism (”working class authoritarianism”), and other political organizations, across the world, in the interwar period and after World War II. One of the important sections is Chapter 2: "Economic Development and Democracy." Larry Diamond and Gary Marks argue that "Lipset's assertion of a direct relationship between economic development and democracy has been subjected to extensive empirical examination, both quantitative and qualitative, in the past 30 years. And the evidence shows, with striking clarity and consistency, a strong causal relationship between economic development and democracy."[2]
In Chapter V, Lipset analyzed "Fascism"—Left, Right, and Center, and explained that the study of the social bases of different modern mass movements suggests that each major social stratum has both democratic and extremist political expressions. He explained the mistakes of identifying extremism as a right wing phenomenon, and Communism with the left wing phenomenon. He underlined that extremist ideologies and groups can be classified and analyzed in the same terms as democratic groups, i.e., right, left, and center.

Political Man was published and republished in several editions, sold more than 400,000 copies and was translated into 20 languages, including: Vietnamese, Bengali, and Serbo-Croatian.[3]

"Cleavage Structures, Party Systems, and Voter Alignments"
In this 1967 co-authored work with Stein Rokkan, Lipset introduced critical juncture theory and made a substantial contributions to cleavage theory.

The Democratic Century 
In The Democratic Century (2004), Lipset sought to explain why North America developed stable democracies and Latin America did not. He argued that the reason for this divergence is that the initial patterns of colonization, the subsequent process of economic incorporation of the new colonies, and the wars of independence varied. The divergent histories of Britain and Iberia are seen as creating different cultural legacies that affected the prospects of democracy.

Public affairs
Lipset left the Socialist Party in 1960 and later described himself as a centrist, deeply influenced by Alexis de Tocqueville, George Washington, Aristotle, and Max Weber. He became active within the Democratic Party's conservative wing, and associated with neoconservatives, without calling himself one.

Lipset was vice-chair of the board of directors of the United States Institute of Peace, a board member of the Albert Shanker Institute, a member of the US Board of Foreign Scholarships, co-chair of the Committee for Labor Law Reform, co-chair of the Committee for an Effective UNESCO, and consultant to the National Endowment for the Humanities, the National Humanities Institute, the National Endowment for Democracy, and the American Jewish Committee.

Lipset was a strong supporter of the state of Israel, and was President of the American Professors for Peace in the Middle East, chair of the National B'nai B'rith Hillel Commission and the Faculty Advisory Cabinet of the United Jewish Appeal, and co-chair of the Executive Committee of the International Center for Peace in the Middle East. He worked for years on seeking solution for the Israeli–Palestinian conflict as part of his larger project of research on the factors that allow societies to sustain stable and peaceful democracies. His work focused on the way in which high levels of socioeconomic development created the preconditions for democracy (see also Amartya Sen's work), and the consequences of democracy for peace.

Awards
Lipset's book The First New Nation was a finalist for the National Book Award. He was also awarded the Townsend Harris and Margaret Byrd Dawson Medals for significant achievement, the Northern Telecom-International Council for Canadian Studies Gold Medal, and the Leon Epstein Prize in Comparative Politics by the American Political Science Association. He received the Marshall Sklare Award for distinction in Jewish studies and, in 1997, he was awarded the Helen Dinnerman Prize by the World Association for Public Opinion Research.

Personal life
Lipset's first wife, Elsie, died in 1987. She was the mother of his three children, David, Daniel, and Carola ("Cici"). David Lipset is a Professor of Anthropology at the University of Minnesota. He had six grandchildren. Lipset was survived by his second wife, Sydnee Guyer (a director of the JCRC), whom he married in 1990.

At age 84, Lipset died as a result of complications following a stroke.

Selected works
  “The Rural Community and Political Leadership in Saskatchewan.” Canadian Journal of Economics and Political Science 13.3 (1947): 410–428.
 Agrarian Socialism: The Cooperative Commonwealth Federation in Saskatchewan, a Study in Political Sociology (1950),  (1972 printing) online edition
 We'll Go Down to Washington (1951)
  "Democracy in Private Government: a case study of the International Typographical Union." British Journal of Sociology (1952)  3:47–58 in JSTOR
 Union Democracy: The Internal Politics of the International Typographical Union (1956) with Martin Trow and James S. Coleman
  "The Biography of a Research Project: Union Democracy." in Sociologists at Work: the craft of social research edited by Phillip E. Hammond. (1964)
 Social Mobility in Industrial Society with Reinhard Bendix (1959),  online edition
 Social Structure and Mobility in Economic Development with Neil J. Smelser (1966),   online edition
 "Some Social Requisites of Democracy: Economic Development and Political Legitimacy." The American Political Science Review Volume 53, Issue 1 (1959): 69-105.
  “Social Stratification and right-wing extremism," British Journal of Sociology (1959) 10:346–382.
 Political Man: The Social Bases of Politics (1960),  online edition
 The First New Nation (1963),  (1980 printing) online edition
 The Berkeley Student Revolt: Facts and Interpretations, edited with Sheldon S. Wolin (1965)
 Party Systems and Voter Alignments, co-edited with Stein Rokkan (Free Press, 1967)
 Student Politics (1967),   online edition
 Revolution and Counterrevolution: Change and Persistence in Social Structures, (1968)  (1988 printing) online version
 editor, Politics and the social sciences (1969)
 Prejudice and Society with Earl Raab
 The Politics of Unreason: Right Wing Extremism in America, 1790–1970 with Earl Raab (1970),  (1978 printing) online edition
 Rebellion in the University (1971)
 The Divided Academy: Professors and Politics with Everett Carll Ladd, Jr. (1975),  online edition
 Consensus and Conflict: Essays in Political Sociology (1985)
 Unions in transition: entering the second century (1986)
 The Confidence Gap: Business, Labor, and Government in the Public Mind (1987)
 editor, Revolution and Counterrevolution: Change and Persistence in Social Structures (1988)
 Continental Divide: The Values and Institutions of the United States and Canada (1989)
 "Liberalism, Conservatism, and Americanism", Ethics & International Affairs vol 3 (1989). online
 "The Social Requisites of Democracy Revisited." American Sociological Review Vol. 59, No. 1: 1-22.
 Jews and the New American Scene with Earl Raab (1995)
 American Exceptionalism: A Double-Edged Sword (1996)  
 It Didn't Happen Here: Why Socialism Failed in the United States with Gary Marks (2000), 
 The Paradox of American Unionism: Why Americans Like Unions More Than Canadians Do, but Join Much Less with Noah Meltz, Rafael Gomez, and Ivan Katchanovski (2004), 
 The Democratic Century with Jason M. Lakin (2004), 
 "Steady Work: An Academic Memoir", in Annual Review of Sociology, Vol. 22, 1996 online version
 "Economic Development and Democracy"

See also

References

Further reading
 Falter, Jürgen W. "Radicalization of the middle classes or mobilization of the unpolitical? The theories of Seymour M. Lipset and Reinhard Bendix on the electoral support of the NSDAP in the light of recent research." Social Science Information 20.2 (1981): 389–430.
 Grajales, Jesus Velasco. "Seymour Martin Lipset: Life and work." The Canadian Journal of Sociology 29.4 (2004): 583–601. online
 Houtman, Dick. "Lipset and 'working-class' authoritarianism." American Sociologist 34.1 (2003): 85–103.  online
 McGovern, Patrick. "The young Lipset on the iron law of oligarchy: a taste of things to come1." British journal of sociology 61.s1 (2010): 29–42. online
 Marks, Gary, and Larry Jay Diamond, eds. Reexamining democracy: essays in honor of Seymour Martin Lipset (Sage, 1992).
 Marks, Gary, and Larry Diamond. "Seymour Martin Lipset and the study of democracy." American Behavioral Scientist 35.4/5 (1992): 352+.
 Marx, Gary. "Travels with Marty: Seymour Martin Lipset as a Mentor," American Sociologist 37#4 (2006) pp. 76–83. online
 Miller, Seymour M., and Frank Riessman. "'Working-Class Authoritarianism': A Critique of Lipset." British Journal of Sociology (1961) 15: 263–276. online
 Smith, David E. ed. Lipset's Agrarian Socialism: A Re-examination (Saskatchewan Institute of Public Policy (SIPP) 2007).
 Wiseman, Nelson. "Reading Prairie Politics: Morton, Lipset, Macpherson." International Journal of Canadian Studies 51 (2015): 7–26.

Resources on Lipset and his research 
 Archer, Robin, "Seymour Martin Lipset and political sociology." The British Journal of Sociology Volume 61, Issues 1 (2010)
 Philipp Korom, "The political sociologist Seymour M. Lipset: Remembered in political science, neglected in sociology." European Journal of Cultural and Political Sociology 6:4 (2019), 448-473, DOI: 10.1080/23254823.2019.1570859 The political sociologist Seymour M. Lipset: Remembered in political science, neglected in sociology - PMC

External links
 Seymour Martin Lipset interview with Ben Wattenberg (PBS)
 Claude S. Fischer and Ann Swidler, "Seymour M. Lipset", Biographical Memoirs of the National Academy of Sciences (2016)
 

1922 births
2006 deaths
American sociologists
American political scientists
Jewish sociologists
Columbia Graduate School of Arts and Sciences alumni
Columbia University faculty
George Mason University faculty
Harvard University faculty
Jewish American writers
Labor historians
Presidents of the American Sociological Association
Academic staff of the University of Toronto
American people of Russian-Jewish descent
Members of the United States National Academy of Sciences
20th-century American historians
21st-century American historians
Social Science Research Council
20th-century American Jews
Members of the American Philosophical Society
20th-century political scientists
Jewish American social scientists